Narrow-bandwidth television (NBTV) is a type of television designed to fit into a channel narrower than the standard bandwidth used for official television standards.

The three predominant worldwide broadcast television standards use either 6 MHz wide channels (as in the Americas and Japan, as ATSC and ISDB-T both use those standards) or 8 MHz (as in most of Europe with DVB-T). Narrow-bandwidth television refers to any method that reduces the bandwidth below that threshold. (These techniques are frequently used in traditional television to allow for multiple digital subchannels on the same bandwidth, but this is not true narrow-bandwidth as the standards do not allow for it, and the extra bandwidth in these cases is usually transferred to another channel.)

Design 

There are three ways to reduce the bandwidth of a video signal: reduce the scan rate, reduce the image size, and/or (with digital television) use heavier compression.  When the scan rate is reduced, this is referred to as slow-scan TV or, in the most extreme cases when the scan rate is too slow to simulate motion, freeze frame television. With reduced image sizes, this is referred to as low-definition television. In the most extreme cases, the number of lines in an image may be reduced to just a few dozen, and bandwidth reduced to a few tens of kilohertz, within the bandwidth of an amateur radio voice channel. Most narrow-bandwidth TV nowadays uses computers and other electronic systems.

Mechanical TV standards 
The earliest mechanical television systems often used narrow channels for sending moving images.  Often, the images were only a few dozen lines in size.

See also 
 History of television
 List of experimental television stations
 Moving image formats
 Prewar television stations
 Television systems before 1940
 PXL-2000

References

External links 

 W9XK Experimental Television at the University of Iowa
 The Narrow Bandwidth Television Association

History of television
Television transmission standards